Edward Floyd (February 21, 1850 – January 16, 1923) was a boilermaker serving in the United States Navy who received the Medal of Honor for bravery.

Biography
Floyd was born on February 21, 1850, in Ireland.

He served as an honorary pallbearer at the Tomb of the Unknown Soldier in 1921.

He died on January 16, 1923, and is buried in Saint Lawrence Cemetery Charleston, South Carolina.

Medal of Honor citation
Rank and organization: Boilermaker, U.S. Navy. Born: 21 February 1850, Ireland. Accredited to: South Carolina. G.O. No.: 182, 20 March 1905.

Citation:

Serving on board the U.S.S. Iowa, for extraordinary heroism at the time of the blowing out of the manhole plate of boiler D on board that vessel, 25 January 1905.

See also

List of Medal of Honor recipients in non-combat incidents

References

External links

1850 births
1923 deaths
19th-century Irish people
United States Navy Medal of Honor recipients
United States Navy sailors
Military personnel from Charleston, South Carolina
Burials in South Carolina
Irish-born Medal of Honor recipients
Irish emigrants to the United States (before 1923)
Irish sailors in the United States Navy
American boilermakers
Non-combat recipients of the Medal of Honor